Kelvin Kent may refer to:

Kelvin Kent (mountaineer), British mountaineer and adventurer
Kelvin Kent (writer), pseudonym for the American fantasy and science fiction author Henry Kuttner